The Sewall-Scripture House, is a historic house museum in Rockport, Massachusetts that is owned by the Sandy Bay Historical Society.  The Sewall Scripture Museum features antiques, period artifacts and items of local history.  The Federal style building, the only house in Rockport built out of native granite, was added to the National Register of Historic Places in 1982.

Description and history
The Sewall-Scripture House is set at the northeast corner of King and Granite Streets (the latter designated Massachusetts Route 127), on the outskirts of Rockport's main village. It is a -story structure with a side-gable roof, whose main block is constructed out of locally quarried granite. A -story wood-frame ell, apparently original to the house's construction, extends to the rear; it is finished in wooden clapboards. The main facade is five bays wide, with a central entry set in a round-arch opening with flanking sidelight windows.

The house was built in 1832 by Levi Sewall, owner of a granite quarry located on Pigeon Cove.  Stone for this house was hauled from the quarry by teams of oxen.  Sewall was one of Rockport's leading quarry owners, his business operating independently until its merger in 1921 with the Rockport Granite Company.  Sewall's descendants owned the house until 1957, at which time it was acquired by the Sandy Bay Historical Society.  Although there are a number of commercial buildings in Rockport built from local stone, this is the only house that is.

See also
National Register of Historic Places listings in Essex County, Massachusetts

References

External links
Sandy Bay Historical Society

Museums in Essex County, Massachusetts
History museums in Massachusetts
Houses in Rockport, Massachusetts
Houses on the National Register of Historic Places in Essex County, Massachusetts